The second season of the animated television series The Simpsons originally aired on the Fox network between October 11, 1990, and July 11, 1991, and contained 22 episodes, beginning with "Bart Gets an "F". Another episode, "Blood Feud", aired during the summer after the official season finale. The executive producers for the second production season were Matt Groening, James L. Brooks, and Sam Simon, who had also been EPs for the previous season. It was produced by Gracie Films and 20th Century Fox Television. The DVD box set was released on August 6, 2002, in Region 1, July 8, 2002 in Region 2 and in September 2002 in Region 4. The episode "Homer vs. Lisa and the 8th Commandment" won the Primetime Emmy Award for Outstanding Animated Program (for Programming Less Than One Hour), and was also nominated in the "Outstanding Sound Mixing for a Comedy Series or a Special" category.

Production
"Two Cars in Every Garage and Three Eyes on Every Fish" was the first episode produced for the season, but Bart Gets an "F" aired first because Bart was popular at the time and the producers had wanted to premiere with a Bart themed episode. The second season featured a new opening sequence, which was shortened from its original length of roughly 90 seconds. The opening sequence for the first season showed Bart stealing a "Bus Stop" sign; whilst the new sequence featured him skateboarding past several characters who had been introduced during the previous season. Starting with this season, there were three versions of the opening: a full roughly 75-second version, a 45-second version and a 25-second version. This gave the show's editors more leeway.

Voice cast & characters

The season saw the introduction of several new recurring characters, including Mayor Quimby, Kang and Kodos, Maude Flanders, Bill and Marty, Dr. Hibbert, Roger Meyers, Jr., Sideshow Mel, Lionel Hutz, Dr. Nick Riviera, Blue Haired Lawyer, Rainier Wolfcastle, Troy McClure, Groundskeeper Willie, Hans Moleman, Professor Frink, Snake  and Comic Book Guy.

Main cast
 Dan Castellaneta as Homer Simpson, Grampa Simpson, Krusty the Clown, Groundskeeper Willie, Troy McClure, Barney Gumble and various others
 Julie Kavner as Marge Simpson, Patty Bouvier, Selma Bouvier and various others
 Nancy Cartwright as Bart Simpson, Nelson Muntz, Ralph Wiggum and various others
 Yeardley Smith as Lisa Simpson
 Harry Shearer as Mr. Burns, Waylon Smithers, Ned Flanders, Principal Skinner, Lenny Leonard, Kent Brockman, and Reverend Lovejoy
 Hank Azaria as Moe Szyslak, Chief Wiggum, Professor Frink, Carl Carlson, Comic Book Guy  and Apu

Recurring
 Pamela Hayden as Milhouse van Houten, Jimbo Jones
 Maggie Roswell as Maude Flanders, Helen Lovejoy and Miss Hoover
 Russi Taylor as Martin Prince and Sherri and Terri
 Tress MacNeille as Mrs. Bloomenstein, Kim and Davey 
 Marcia Wallace as Edna Krabappel
 Jon Lovitz as Artie Ziff, Professor Lombardo and the doughnut delivery man
 Jo Ann Harris as background characters

Guest stars

 Phil Hartman as Troy McClure, Lionel Hutz, Moses, Plato and various others (various episodes)
 Harvey Fierstein as Karl ("Simpson and Delilah")
 James Earl Jones as the mover, Serak the Preparer, and the narrator of "The Raven" ("Treehouse of Horror")
 Tony Bennett as himself ("Dancin' Homer")
 Tom Poston as the Capital City Goofball ("Dancin' Homer")
 Daryl L. Coley as "Bleeding Gums" Murphy ("Dancin' Homer")
 Ken Levine as Dan Horde ("Dancin' Homer")
 Greg Berg as Rory ("Bart vs. Thanksgiving")
 Alex Rocco as Roger Meyers, Jr. ("Itchy & Scratchy & Marge")
 Larry King as himself ("One Fish, Two Fish, Blowfish, Blue Fish")
 George Takei as Akira Kurosawa ("One Fish, Two Fish, Blowfish, Blue Fish")
 Danny DeVito as Herb Powell ("Oh Brother, Where Art Thou?")
 Tracey Ullman as Emily Winthrop and Sylvia Winfield ("Bart's Dog Gets an "F")
 Frank Welker as animal voices ("Bart's Dog Gets an "F")
 Audrey Meadows as Beatrice "Bea" Simmons ("Old Money")
 Ringo Starr as himself ("Brush with Greatness")
 Dustin Hoffman as Mr. Bergstrom  ("Lisa's Substitute")
 Cloris Leachman as Mrs. Glich ("Three Men and a Comic Book") 
 Daniel Stern as the adult version of Bart ("Three Men and a Comic Book")

Reception

Ratings
Due to the show's success during its abbreviated first season, Fox decided to move The Simpsons from its Sunday night lineup on August 23, 1990. The move came as the still-fledgling network was adding two additional nights of programming to its lineup, one of which was Thursday. Fox placed The Simpsons in the leadoff position of their lineup for their initial Thursday offerings, with the new sitcom Babes and a new Aaron Spelling-produced drama, Beverly Hills 90210, offering competition for the lineups fielded by the other networks including ratings champion NBC.

The Simpsons settled into the 8:00 PM position, which put it in direct competition with the five-time defending #1 show in all of television, The Cosby Show. Many of the producers, including James L. Brooks, were against the move because The Simpsons had been in the top 10 while airing on Sunday and they felt the move would destroy its ratings. All through the summer of 1990, several news outlets published stories about the supposed "Bill vs. Bart" rivalry. At the time, NBC had 208 television stations, while Fox had only 133. 

Bart Gets an "F" was the first episode to air against The Cosby Show and averaged an 18.4 Nielsen rating and 29% of the audience. In the weeks ratings, it finished tied for eighth behind The Cosby Show which had an 18.5 rating. However, an estimated 33.6 million viewers watched the episode, making it the number one show in terms of actual viewers that week. At the time, it was the most watched episode in the history of Fox. The next week, "Simpson and Delilah" had a 16.2 rating and 25% share while the Cosby Show managed to maintain its 18.5 rating. However, viewer-wise, The Simpsons won again with 29.9 million viewers. 

The next week, "Treehouse of Horror" fell in the ratings, finishing 24th. Ratings wise, new episodes of The Cosby Show beat The Simpsons every time during the second season and The Simpsons eventually fell out of the top 10. 

"Three Men and a Comic Book" would boast the only victory over The Cosby Show, finishing 23rd in the weekly ratings while a rerun of Cosby finished 26th. At the end of the season, Cosby averaged as the fifth highest rated show on television while The Simpsons was 38th. It would not be until the seventeenth episode of the third season, "Homer at the Bat," that The Simpsons would beat The Cosby Show in the ratings. The show remained in its Thursday timeslot until the sixth season.

Reception
The second season of The Simpsons received critical acclaim. On Rotten Tomatoes, the season has a 100% approval rating based on 8 critical reviews. On aggregate review website Metacritic, a site which uses a weighted mean score, the season scored a 92/100 based on seven critics, indicating "universal acclaim".

At the 7th annual Television Critics Association Awards, the second season of the show was nominated for 'Outstanding Achievement in Comedy' but lost to "Murphy Brown."

Episodes

DVD release

The DVD boxset for season two was released by 20th Century Fox in the United States and Canada on August 6, 2002, eleven years after it had completed broadcast on television. As well as every episode from the season, the DVD release features bonus material including commentaries for every episode. The commentaries were recorded in late 2001.

References

Bibliography

External links

 Season 2 at the BBC

Simpsons season 02
1990 American television seasons
1991 American television seasons